Swecoin was a thermal printer manufacturing company based in Sollentuna, Sweden. They also had a US-based sales division, Swecoin US Inc, based in Rhode Island. Today the previous Swecoin business is an integrated part of the Zebra Technologies Corporation.

Swecoin's printer designs utilize a patented looping presenter mechanism in which a paper loop is formed inside the printer before the printout is presented to the user of the printer to prevent the user from removing the printout before it has completed.

History

The company Swecoin AB was founded in 1983, as a successor to the mechanical cash-register company Sweda. Originally the focus was to sell spare parts and similar for these machines.

The company then branched into importing and distributing Point of Sales printers from manufacturers such as Data Techno.

In the very early 1990s the company started developing its own products, kiosk and ticket printers.
Shortly after this a US distribution company, Swecoin US Inc, was founded in Rhode Island.

The company grew organically and through acquisitions during the 1990s.
Acquisitions included the component distribution company Promakon, the injection moulding company Nya Ovansjö Plast och Verktyg and the Pay and Display Parking machine manufacturer AB Cale Industi.

In 1997 the Swecoin Group was acquired by Metric Gruppen, owned by Rune Andersson.

In late 1999, some of the original owners bought back the core Swecoin printer business from Metric.
The business grew significantly from this point with several new product lines being introduced, for example the TTP 2000 series.

In October 2006 Swecoin was acquired by the Zebra Technologies Corporation, and by the end of 2009 it was fully integrated into  Zebra Technologies.

Technology

During its entire history Swecoin has been on the leading edge of kiosk and ticket printer development.
The looping presenter and pull detector for forced paper ejection are key examples of this as well as launching a USB kiosk printer as early as 1998.
Other examples include network connectable ticket printers with magnetic encoding capabilities.

Products

In 2008, the product line consisted of:

TTP 1000 kiosk printer - 58mm print width
TTP 2000 kiosk printer - 58 to 82,5mm print width
TTP 7030 kiosk printer - 80 and 112mm print width
TTP 8000 kiosk printer - 210 and 216mm print width
TTP 2100 ticket printer
TTPM2 ticket printer with magnetic encoding
TTPM3 ticket printer with magnetic encoding

External links
 Swecoin
 Swecoin - US division
  for Looping Presenter

Computer printer companies